Stejaru is a commune in Tulcea County, Northern Dobruja, Romania. It is composed of three villages: Mina Altân Tepe, Stejaru (historical names: Eschibaba, Karapelit), and Vasile Alecsandri.

In Stejaru there is the most compact Aromanian community of Romania. The Aromanian language is taught in the schools of the commune.

The Altân Tepe copper mine is situated on the territory of the commune; after operating for 105 years, the mine was closed in 2003 due to non-profitability.

Stadionul Săgeata is a multi-purpose stadium in Stejaru; built in 1960, this is the home ground of the football club Săgeata Stejaru.

References

Communes in Tulcea County
Localities in Northern Dobruja
Aromanian settlements in Romania